Springtown is an unincorporated community in Clay Township, Hendricks County, Indiana.

A post office was established at Springtown in 1843, and remained in operation until it was discontinued in 1865.

Geography

References

Unincorporated communities in Hendricks County, Indiana
Unincorporated communities in Indiana
Indianapolis metropolitan area
1843 establishments in Indiana